The Baked Bean Museum of Excellence is a private museum located in Port Talbot, Wales, United Kingdom.

Founding 
The museum is owned by Barry Kirk, who changed his name by deed poll to Captain Beany. The museum is located in the living room, bathroom and kitchen of his council flat. Captain Beany raises money each year for charity.

Exhibits 
The museum contains examples of branded food cans, advertising and other promotional items associated with baked beans. There are also items from a number of food brands including Heinz, Crosse & Blackwell, Branston, HP and Van Camp's, as well as items relating to the comedy character Mr Bean. There are over 500 items in the museum, and Beany estimates that he has spent over £10,000 building his collection.

Unlike many museums, the Baked Bean Museum of Excellence has no gift shop on-site. Instead, Captain Beany operates a market stall in local businesses on weekends only, selling branded souvenirs of both the Museum and of his Captain Beany persona.

Culture
The museum is registered with the Association of Independent Museums. Comedian Danny Wallace is a patron. In 2018, the museum was the fourth most visited attraction in Port Talbot, according to figures by TripAdvisor.

In 2010, Beany believed that his was the only museum in the world dedicated to baked beans. In 2019, Heinz opened a museum, in the form of a pop-up "Beanz Museum" in Covent Garden London between 30 August and 1 September. The museum contained exhibitions about the Heinz brand to mark the company's 150th anniversary .

References

See also

 Museums in Wales
 Tourism in Wales

Museums in Neath Port Talbot
Museum of Excellence
Food museums in the United Kingdom
Port Talbot